The Strebe 1995 projection, Strebe projection, Strebe lenticular equal-area projection, or Strebe equal-area polyconic projection is an equal-area map projection presented by Daniel "daan" Strebe in 1994. Strebe designed the projection to keep all areas proportionally correct in size; to push as much of the inevitable distortion as feasible away from the continental masses and into the Pacific Ocean; to keep a familiar equatorial orientation; and to do all this without slicing up the map.

Description 
Strebe first presented the projection at a joint meeting of the Canadian Cartographic Association and the North American Cartographic Information Society (NACIS) in August 1994. Its final formulation was completed in 1995. The projection has been available in the map projection software Geocart since Geocart 1.2, released in October 1994.

The projection is arrived at by a series of steps, each of which preserves areas. Because each step preserves areas, the entire process preserves areas. The steps use a technique invented by Strebe called "substitute deprojection" or "Strebe's transformation". First, the Eckert IV projection is computed. Then, pretending that the Eckert projection is actually a shrunken portion of the Mollweide projection, the Eckert is "deprojected" back onto the sphere using the inverse transformation of the Mollweide projection. This yields a full-sphere-to-partial-sphere map. Then this mapped sphere is projected back to the plane using the Hammer projection. While the projections named here are the ones that define the Strebe 1995 projection, the substitute deprojection principle is not constrained to particular projections.

The projection as described can be formulated as follows:

where  is solved iteratively:

In these formulae,  represents longitude and  represents latitude.

Strebe's preferred arrangement is to set , as shown, and 11°E as the central meridian to avoid dividing eastern Siberia's Chukchi Peninsula. However, s can be modified to change the appearance without destroying the equal-area property.

See also 
 List of map projections

References

External links 
 New York Times book review for Carl Zimmer's Science ink, showing the Strebe projection as a large tattoo.
 First published formulation of the Strebe projection.

Map projections
Equal-area projections